Universidad de Concepción (UdeC), is a traditional Chilean private university, the work of the Penquista community, one of the most prestigious in its country, considered complex due to its extensive research in the various areas of knowledge. Founded on May 14, 1919, it is the third oldest university in Chile, and one of the 25 universities belonging to the Council of Rectors of Chilean Universities.

Its headquarters are located in the city of Concepción, and also has two other campuses in Chillán and Los Ángeles. In a citizen survey carried out in 2012, it was chosen as the symbol that most identifies Penquists.

It was the first University created in the center-south zone of the country, besides being the 1st to be constituted as a private law corporation and belong to the Cruz del Sur University Network; it also belongs to the G9 University Network. The University of Concepción also had a pioneering role in the reform movement of Chilean universities that took place at the end of the 1960s. It was the first Chilean university that approved the University Reform in that period (1968), giving greater participation to students in university management. The origins of the MIR (Chile) is also found amid the student movement at the University of Concepción in that period.

The main promoter of the foundation of the university was Chilean educator and lawyer Enrique Molina Garmendia, who sought to create the 1st secular university in Chile. As part of its educational line, the University of Concepción devotes a large part of its budget to academic research.

By 2012, the total number of graduates of this house of studies amounted to 57,000. It also teaches 23,700 students, 2,166 of them graduate programs; 72% of its professors have doctorates or master's degrees and its infrastructure, with  built, is one of the largest in Chile.

It is currently accredited by the National Accreditation Commission (CNA-Chile) for the maximum period of seven years, from November 2016 to November 2023. Figure in the third position within the Chilean universities according to the webometric classification of the CSIC (July 2017) and in the third position according to the AméricaEconomía 2017 ranking as well as national and international rankings. Within the Chilean universities, it is also among the 11 that figure in the QS 2017 world university ranking, among the 10 that appear in the Times Higher Education 2017 ranking, and among the 25 that appear in the ranking of Scimago Institution Rankings (SIR) 2017, with the 3rd position nationally and 572th worldwide.

Its Concepción campus was declared a National Heritage in 2016 by the Council of National Monuments of Chile; what makes it the 1st and only University in Chile to have this recognition due to the design and architectural style of its environment that has been implemented in its buildings and campus-level environment since its foundation; the proclamation grants the university special protection and conservation of the campus and its space by the state; therefore, any intervention to the same has to be reported to the Council of Monuments, while any damage and type of vandalism that jeopardizes the integrity and security of the campus will be seriously penalized according to the law that regulates and covers the National Monuments, as well as the prompt construction of the 1st and only Bío Bío Technological Science Park (PACYT) in all of Chile located in the Bío-Bío Region, near the campus of the Universidad de Concepción; which at the same time will be in charge of the administration, organization, and projection of new ideas with a view to the future of it together with the Government of Chile; this initiative is going to be projected as a productive space of the future and a relevant pole of the development of the country, the place where all the creative potential will be housed, knowledge and innovations of high impact will be generated.

History

Background
In the late 19th and early 20th centuries, many scholars from Concepción started to plead for the construction of a university for the south of Chile where it would be possible to study professional degrees outside the capital, Santiago. However, a project of this magnitude required a high level of organization, which as yet did not exist. In February 1917, the newspaper El Sur reported:

Committee Pro-University
On March 23, 1917, the first official meeting took place to realise two goals of the citizens of Concepción: a clinical hospital and a university.

After debate, a committee was named to take charge of the construction of these two projects. The projects were closely related because the hospital would become the base of the new university's medical school. Some notable members of the committee included Enrique Molina Garmendia, Pedro Nolasco, Edmundo Larenas and Virginio Gómez.

Foundation
The commission then presented the documentation to Congress that would officially create the university. These were sent and approved, and on May 14, 1919, Enrique Molina Garmendia founded the university and became its first rector.

Nowadays, the university is funded by various organisations belonging to the "University of Concepción Corporation". The Lottery is one of the main organisations. With this funding, the University of Concepción has become one of the most modern and important universities in Chile.

Organization

The University of Concepción is divided into three campuses, located in Chillán, Los Ángeles and Concepción. The latter is the main and most important campus.

Concepción Campus

The university is located in the University District. The whole campus comprises what is known as the Ciudad Universitaria (University City), which also contains museums, sculptures and parks. Today, the campus has an area of 1,425,000 m2, of which 239,856 are built upon. It is the knowledge, science, culture, technology and research centre of the city of Concepción. The Presencia de América Latina mural by Jorge González Camarena is within the Casa del Arte on the university campus.

In 2010, the University of Concepción campus was named one of Chile's most important architectural works from the first half of the 20th century. The "Obra Bicentenario" award distinguishes works that, in the last 100 years, have changed the face of Chile's cities and most improved the quality of life of its inhabitants.

Chillán Campus

The Chillán campus was founded in 1955 with the support of many institutions such as the United Nations, the OAS, American and European universities, and others. It mainly focuses on agricultural sciences and has approximately 2,000 students, more than 100 academic staff and 250 administrative staff.

Los Ángeles Campus

The Los Ángeles campus was founded in 1962 at the request of the people of the province to the university rector, David Stitchkin Branover. Currently, it has 1,300 students and 35 full-time teachers, plus other part-time academic staff.

Schools and Departments

The University of Concepción is made up of 19 schools and departments:

Department of Agronomy.
Department of Architecture, Urban Planning and Geography.
Department of Biological Sciences.
School of Economics and Business Administration.
Department of Physical Sciences and Mathematics.
Department of Forestry.
School of Law and Social Sciences.
Department of Natural and Oceanographic Sciences.
Department of Chemical Sciences.
Department of Nursing.
Department of Social Sciences.
School of Veterinary Science.
School of Education.
Department of Pharmaceutical Chemistry.
School of Humanities and Arts.
Department of Engineering.
Department of Agricultural Engineering.
School of Medicine.
School of Dentistry.
School of Pharmacy.
School of Environmental Sciences

Administration

The university's current rector is Carlos Saavedra Rubilar. The university belongs to the Council of Rectors of Traditional Chilean Universities. 
The rectors that have directed the university have been:

See also

 Concepción
 List of universities in Chile

External links
 University of Concepción webpage
 "Presencia de América Latina" webpage
 Short documentary about the mural "Presencia de América Latina"

References

 
Universities in Chile
University of Concepcion
Educational institutions established in 1919
Forestry education
Concepción, Chile
1919 establishments in Chile